The National Organization of Minority Architects (NOMA) is a professional organization for individuals practicing architecture and allied professionals to advance justice and equity in communities of color.

History 
In 1968, activist and executive director of the National Urban League, Whitney Young was invited to address the American Institute of Architects (AIA) National Convention in Portland, Oregon as the keynote speaker. In his speech, he addressed the institute's silent stance on the turmoil in the country and urged them to stand up and endorse the efforts of John F. Kennedy & Martin Luther King Jr. in their actions. This speech encouraged the profession to work towards the advancement of minority architects, who, at the time, made up of 0.05% of AIA's 20,000 members. 

At the 1971 AIA National Convention in Detroit, 12 black architects, including William Brown and John S. Chase, began to organize to create an organization that developed and advanced black architects, which would become the National Organization of Minority Architects (NOMA). The organization aimed to promote and advocate for black architects and their work through networking opportunities and education. The organization's advocacy first focused on government contracts to include minority participation. The first president of the organization was founder Wendell Campbell who held the position until 1973.

In 1992, NOMA Students was created during the national conference in Washington.

Organization

Membership 
Membership is open to anyone in the architecture, engineering, and construction (AEC) fields. NOMA members are registered with their local NOMA professional chapter or at-large members when there is not a chapter local to them. As of 2022, there are 36 professional chapters and 86 student chapters.

There are five types of membership in NOMA:

 Licensed Professional - Individuals licensed to practice architecture in the United States
 Associate Member - Individuals with three or more years of professional architecture experience but not licensed architects
 Emerging Professional - Individuals with three or less years of professional architecture experience but not licensed architects
 International Member - Individuals who have an equivalent architectural license from a non-U.S. licensing authority
 Student Member - Individuals currently enrolled in an accredited architecture program
 Allied Professional - Individuals who are not practicing architecture but are in positions related to the field

Structure 
At the national level, NOMA is governed by a board of directors and supported by a leadership council. There are four regions that lead state and local chapters and facilitate communication between those and national leadership. Each state is seen as a chapter and there can be additional professional and student chapters within the state.

Service 
By speaking with a united voice, NOMA members influence government practices that affect the practice of the profession by minorities and have advocated for government contracts to include minority participation.

The organization develops mentorship programs, student grants, and partnerships with other organizations including AIA to increase minorities in the field.

Presidents 

Wendell Jerome Campbell, 1971–1973
Leroy Campbell, 1974
John S. Chase, 1975
Charles F. McAfee, FAIA, NOMAC, 1976
Kenneth B. Groggs, 1977
Andrew Heard, 1978
Leon Bridges, 1981
Harold Williams, 1982
Paul S. Devrouax, 1983
Marshall Purnell, 1985
Earl Kai Chann, 1987–1988, first non-Black president

Harry Overstreet, 1989–1990
William Stanley III, 1991–1992
Robert Easter, FAIA, NOMAC, 1993–1994
Michael A. Rogers, AIA, NOMAC, 1995
Cheryl L. McAfee, FAIA, NOMAC, 1996, first female president
Roberta Washington, 1997
Ronald E. Garner, NOMAC, 1998
William E. Davis Jr., AIA, NOMAC, 1999
Paul L. Taylor Jr., AIA, NOMAC, 2001
Kenneth Martin, AIA, NOMAC, 2002
Drake Dillard, 2003

James Washington Jr., FAIA, NOMAC, 2004–2006
Carlton Smith, FAIA, NOMAC, 2007–2008
R. Steven Lewis, FAIA, NOMAC, 2009–2010
Sanford Garner, AIA, NOMAC, 2011–2012
Kathy Denise Dixon, FAIA, NOMAC, 2013–2014
Kevin Holland, FAIA, NOMAC, 2015–2016
Bryan Hudson, AIA, NOMAC, 2017–2018
Kimberly Dowdell, 2019–2020
Jason Pugh, AIA, NOMA, 2021–2022
Pascale Sablan, FAIA, NOMA, 2023–2024

References

External links 
 NOMA website

Architecture groups